Hwang Kyeong-tae (born August 17, 1996) is South Korean professional baseball infielder who is currently playing for the Doosan Bears of the KBO League. His major position is shortstop, however, he sometimes plays as second baseman or third baseman. He graduated from Daegu Sangwon High School and was selected for the Doosan Bears by a draft in 2016 (2nd draft, 2nd round).

References

External links 
 Career statistics and player information from the KBO League
 Hwang Kyung-tae at Doosan Bears Baseball Club

1996 births
Living people
South Korean baseball players
KBO League infielders
Doosan Bears players
Sportspeople from Daegu